Chewton Keynsham is a hamlet on the River Chew in the Chew Valley, Somerset, England.

The hamlet lies on the Monarch's Way long distance footpath.

Government and politics 
Chewton Keynsham is part of the Farmborough Ward which is represented by one councillor on the Bath and North East Somerset unitary authority which has wider responsibilities for services such as education, refuse, tourism etc. The village is a part of the North East Somerset constituency. Prior to Brexit in 2020, it was part of the South West England constituency of the European Parliament.

Demographics 
According to the 2011 Census, the E00072685 output area (which extended from Queens Charlton to Burnett, both with higher populations), had 286 residents of which 40 were children, living in 117 households. Of these 242 described their health as 'good' or 'very good', 32 adults had no qualifications; 1 person was unemployed, whereas 77 were economically inactive, which includes carers, 18 students and 44 retirees.

Geography 
The settlement is linear with outlying farms on the valley slopes and has an 18th-century bridge crossing the River Chew, which follows the course of the village street north-south. Farmland occupies most of the mixed clay and calciferous hillsides and semi-plateaus above, interspersed by small areas of ancient woodland and many hedgerows.

Chewton Place 
The large house known as Chewton Place is a Grade II listed building. It was built about 1762 for the Popham family and further extended c. 1786. It was extensively remodelled in 1860–70 and restored in 1968 after flood damage. The house was fully renovated between 2013 and 2017. The building contains a number of historic features including a fine plaster ceiling from the late 19th century and a Gothic staircase.

A folly tower, known locally as the Owl Tower, was built in the grounds in the late 18th century — a tall tapering square obelisk of coursed limestone, finished with a pyramidal cap. It has pointed-arched openings, east and west, giving a walk-through passage at the base, and diagonal buttresses. The carved owl on a keystone probably gives the folly, which is Grade II listed, its name. The gardens were laid out in the 18th century and include a ha-ha and riverside walks. The bridge next to the entrance lodge is also listed. The Lodge itself is an 18th-century building but remodelled in the Gothic style at the same time as the main house was altered in the 1860s.

See also 
Chewton Mendip, upriver, also in Somerset
Chewton, Victoria, Australia

References

External links 

 Chew Valley website, archived in 2006
 River Chew website, Jason Allen

Hamlets in Bath and North East Somerset